Malcolm Swan (born 4 December 1934) is a former Scotland international rugby union player.

Rugby Union career

Amateur career

He went to Fettes College and captained their 1st XV rugby side. He left the college at Christmas 1954.

He played for Oxford University, gaining his blue in 1957.

He then moved on to London Scottish. He made his debut for Scottish against London Welsh in January 1958.

Provincial career

He played for Whites Trial against Blues Trial on 14 December 1957.

He was said to impress in that match and that aided his selection for Scotland Probables in the final trial match against Scotland Possibles on 28 December 1957.

International career

He was capped 8 times for Scotland between 1958–1959.

References

1934 births
Possibly living people
Scottish rugby union players

Scotland international rugby union players
Oxford University RFC players
London Scottish F.C. players
Rugby union locks
Whites Trial players
Scotland Probables players